Ishmail Carzell Wainright (born September 12, 1994) is an American-Ugandan professional basketball player for the Phoenix Suns of the National Basketball Association (NBA). He played college basketball for the Baylor Bears, as well as playing football as a tight end. Wainright is the grandson of former NBA player Maurice King.

High school career
Wainright played two seasons for head coach Stu Vetter at Montrose Christian School in Rockville, Maryland, helping the team to 19–5 record as senior in 2012–13. He earned 2013 All-MET honors after averaging 8.8 points, 9.1 rebounds, and 8.2 assists for Mustangs. He began his prep career at Raytown South High School in suburban Kansas City, where he averaged 13.6 points and 9.8 rebounds as a sophomore in 2010–11. A consensus top-75 recruit, he was ranked No. 28 in 2013 class by ESPN.com, No. 51 by Scout.com, No. 52 by Rivals.com, and No. 62 by 247Sports.com.

College career
Wainright played four seasons of basketball for the Baylor Bears. He averaged 5.9 points, 4.3 rebounds and 2.6 assists per game as a junior. As a senior, Wainright averaged 5.5 points, 5.1 rebounds, 3.2 assists and 1.7 steals per game. He was named to the Big 12 All-Defensive Team. He played one season of football after his basketball career, playing tight end. Wainright had four catches for 34 yards and two touchdowns.

After finishing his career at Baylor, Wainright joined the Buffalo Bills of the NFL as an undrafted free agent, but he did not make the final roster.

Professional career

Nürnberg Falcons (2018–2019) 
Wainright returned to basketball and signed with Nürnberg Falcons BC on September 3, 2018. He averaged 12.1 points, 7.5 rebounds and 2.8 assists per game.

Rasta Vechta (2019–2020) 
On July 2, 2019, Wainright signed with Rasta Vechta. Wainright averaged 10.5 points, 5.8 rebounds, 2.4 assist and 1.8 steals per game.

SIG Strasbourg (2020–2021) 
On June 17, 2020, he signed with SIG Strasbourg.

Phoenix Suns (2021–present) 
On August 7, 2021, Wainright signed a two-year, non-guaranteed deal with the Toronto Raptors, but was waived by the Raptors on October 17. Five days later, he signed a two-way contract with the Phoenix Suns. Wainright later made his NBA debut on November 19 near the end of a win against the Dallas Mavericks, with him recording his first official points, rebounds, and assist two days later in a blowout win over the Denver Nuggets. On January 30, 2022, Wainright scored a then-season-high 10 points and put up two blocks in 20 minutes of action (including the entirety of the fourth quarter) in a 115–110 win over the San Antonio Spurs. On April 6, he surpassed his season bests with career highs of 20 points and 8 rebounds in a close loss to the Los Angeles Clippers. On April 10, the Suns converted his deal into a standard contract.

Wainright joined the Suns' 2022 NBA Summer League roster. On August 4, 2022, Wainright signed a two-way contract with the Suns. After dealing with lower back pain and then the death of his father, pastor Calvin Wainright, Ishmail Wainright returned to action with the Suns on November 16, hitting a three-pointer in a 130–119 win over the defending champion Golden State Warriors.

On February 24, 2023, Wainwright signed a two-year, $2.5 million deal with the Suns, including a team option for the 2023–24 season. Wainwright previously operated under a two-way contract and was nearing the 50-game limit. On March 5 against the Dallas Mavericks, coach Monty Williams made a decision late in the third quarter to substitute starter Josh Okogie, who had missed all of his eight three-point attempts, with Wainright. Although he had not played in the game up until that point, Wainwright made a significant impact, hitting four of his five three-point attempts, helping the Suns secure a 130–126 victory.

National team career
Wainright represents the country of Uganda internationally. He was on the roster during AfroBasket 2021.

Career statistics

NBA

Regular season 

|-
| style="text-align:left;"| 
| style="text-align:left;"| Phoenix
| 45 || 0 || 8.0 || .394 || .322 || .583 || 1.2 || .3 || .4 || .1 || 2.4
|- class="sortbottom"
| style="text-align:center;" colspan="2"| Career
| 45 || 0 || 8.0 || .394 || .322 || .583 || 1.2 || .3 || .4 || .1 || 2.4

Playoffs

|-
| style="text-align:left;"| 2022
| style="text-align:left;"| Phoenix
| 7 || 0 || 3.8 || .417 || .500 || — || 1.6 || .1 || .1 || .1 || 1.9
|- class="sortbottom"
| colspan=2 style="text-align:center"|Career
| 7 || 0 || 3.8 || .417 || .500 || — || 1.6 || .1 || .1 || .1 || 1.9

Personal life
Wainright's father, Calvin Wainright, was born under his mother Marvine Wainright and raised by Marvine and her husband Alvin Joe, while his biological father was former NBA player Maurice King, making him a half-sibling to King's other siblings. During Calvin's adult life, up until his death on October 31, 2022, Calvin was a pastor and youth basketball coach in Kansas City, Missouri. In 2020, he received the Kansas City People's Choice Awards Humanitarian Award for his work in the city. Ish learned who his grandfather from his mother's side of the family was while he was playing for Baylor, which he honored in a match against Kansas University by going under the name of Ishmail King-Wainright throughout the game.

Wainright also has a younger brother named Amaad that also previously played college basketball. Amaad played basketball collegiately at Trinity Valley Community College in the NJCAA, Kansas State University in the NCAA, and Louisiana State University Shreveport in the NAIA. During his only season in Kansas State, Amaad and the Wildcats made it to the 2018 NCAA Tournament, going as far as the Elite 8 in their tournament run that season.

As an American born in Kansas City, Missouri, Ish Wainright was convinced by Uganda men's national basketball team coaches George Galanopoulous and Mike Schmitz to become a naturalized Ugandan and secure an African passport to help build the team and increase employment opportunities.

See also
List of second-generation National Basketball Association players

References

External links

Baylor Bears bio
From Josh Allen to Chris Paul: Ish Wainright's winding journey to the NBA

1994 births
Living people
American expatriate basketball people in France
American expatriate basketball people in Germany
American football tight ends
American men's basketball players
Basketball players from Kansas City, Missouri
Baylor Bears football players
Baylor Bears men's basketball players
Nürnberg Falcons BC players
Phoenix Suns players
Power forwards (basketball)
SC Rasta Vechta players
SIG Basket players
Ugandan men's basketball players
Undrafted National Basketball Association players